The 1998 Ohio State Buckeyes football team represented the Ohio State University in the  1998 NCAA Division I-A football season.  The team's head football coach was John Cooper.  The Buckeyes played their home games in Ohio Stadium. The team finished the season with a win–loss record of 11–1, and a Big Ten Conference record of 7–1.  They were co-champions of the Big Ten Conference with the Wisconsin Badgers and the Michigan Wolverines and played in one of the premiere Bowl Championship Series bowl games, the 1999 Sugar Bowl.

Led by senior quarterback Joe Germaine, the Buckeyes were the preseason number one team and remained top-ranked throughout the majority of the season. The Buckeyes only loss came late in the season to the Michigan State Spartans. The team blew a 15-point lead late in the game to fall 28–24.

Because of the late loss, Ohio State was kept out of the National Championship Game, the 1999 Fiesta Bowl. Their regular season "miss" of not playing fellow tri-champion Wisconsin also cost the Buckeyes a trip to the 1999 Rose Bowl because Ohio State was the last to play in the Rose Bowl in 1997, Wisconsin last played in 1994.
  
The Buckeyes beat Texas A&M in the Sugar Bowl to finish second in both polls behind the Tennessee Volunteers after their victory over Florida State in the Fiesta Bowl.

Schedule

Game summaries

West Virginia

Toledo

Missouri

Penn State

Illinois

Minnesota

Northwestern

Indiana

Michigan State

Iowa

Michigan

Ohio State secured a share of its 28th Big Ten title as the fans stormed the field with less than 30 seconds to play. Joe Germaine completed 19-of-24 passes for 330 yards, his seventh career 300-yard game, and his favorite target was David Boston, who finished with 10 receptions for 217 yards, most ever by a Michigan opponent. Boston also broke his own single-season reception mark and moved past Cris Carter on the school's all-time yardage list.

Texas A&M

Roster

Coaching staff
 John Cooper - Head Coach - 11th year
 Bill Conley - Tight Ends, Recruiting Coordinator (12th year)
 Jim Heacock - Defensive Tackles (3rd year)
 Mike Jacobs - Offensive Coordinator, Offensive Line (4th year)
 Fred Pagac - Defensive Coordinator, Linebackers (17th year)
 Tim Salem - Quarterbacks (2nd year)
 Shawn Simms - Defensive Ends (2nd year)
 Tim Spencer - Running Backs (5th year)
 Chuck Strobart - Wide Receivers (4th year)
 Jon Tenuta - Defensive Backs (3rd year)

Depth chart

Q

Rankings

1999 NFL draftees

References

Ohio State
Ohio State Buckeyes football seasons
Big Ten Conference football champion seasons
Sugar Bowl champion seasons
Ohio State Buckeyes football